Joseph Bernard DePastino (born September 4, 1973 in Philadelphia, Pennsylvania) is an American professional baseball player.  A catcher, DePastino made his Major League Baseball debut in 2003 for the New York Mets.

DePastino played baseball and attended Riverview High School.

After spending over 10 years in the minor leagues as a journeyman catcher, DePastino was called up to the Mets in early August 2003 due to injuries. He made his Major League debut on August 5, pinch-hitting and striking out against the Houston Astros. He only lasted one more at-bat the following day against Houston before being sent down. He retired in 2005.

DePastino served as manager for the Detroit Tigers' Class A affiliate, West Michigan Whitecaps of the Midwest League, from 2008-2010.  He is currently serving as the Tigers minor league-wide roving catching coordinator. He also has 2 kids Gia and Rocco depastino who both play softball or baseball.

References

External links
Baseballcube.com profile

1973 births
New York Mets players
Living people
Baseball players from Philadelphia
Long Island Ducks players
Riverview High School (Sarasota, Florida) alumni
American expatriate baseball players in Australia
Minor league baseball managers
Bowie Baysox players
Gulf Coast Red Sox players
Michigan Battle Cats players
Norfolk Tides players
Pawtucket Red Sox players
Richmond Braves players
Rochester Red Wings players
Round Rock Express players
Sarasota Red Sox players
Syracuse SkyChiefs players
Trenton Thunder players